Caravan Palace is the debut studio album by the electro swing group Caravan Palace, released on 20 October 2008. The album performed best in the band's native France where it reached a peak chart position of No. 11 in August 2009, and remained on the French albums chart for 68 consecutive weeks. In 2009. It was awarded a gold certification from the Independent Music Companies Association which indicated sales of at least 100,000 copies in Europe.

Track listing

Personnel
 Hugues Payen – violin
 Arnaud Vial – guitar
 Charles Delaporte – double bass
 Camille Chapelière – clarinet
 Antoine Toustou – trombone, drum machine
 Aurélien Trigo (Ariel T) – guitar, DJ
 Colotis Zoe – vocalist

References

External links
 caravanpalace.com

2008 debut albums
Caravan Palace albums